The term U.S. Open or US Open is applied to "open" United States-hosted championships in a particular sport (or non-sport organized competitive gaming activity), in which anyone, amateur or professional, American or non-American, and generally, male or female, may compete.

The term most commonly refers to:
 U.S. Open (golf)
 US Open (tennis)

Other uses include (in alphabetical order by sport/game):
 U.S. Open Badminton Championships
 U.S. Open Beer Championship
 U.S. Open (bowling)
 U.S. Open Chess Championship
 U.S. Open (crosswords)
 US Open of Curling
 U.S. Open (cycling)
 US Open (darts)
 U.S. Open (go), boardgame tournament
 U.S. Women's Open, golf tournament
 US Open Polo Championship
 U.S. Open pool championships including:
 U.S. Open Straight Pool Championship
 U.S. Open Bank Pool Championship
 U.S. Open Eight-ball Championship
 U.S. Open Nine-ball Championship
 U.S. Open Ten-ball Championship
 US Open Racquetball Championships
 U.S. Open Rubik's Cube Championship
 U.S. Open Cup, soccer tournament held between American soccer clubs from Major League Soccer, minor leagues, and amateur associations
 U.S. Open Snowboarding
 U.S. Open (squash)
 U.S. Open (swimming)
 U.S. Open of Surfing
 U.S. Open (table tennis)
 U.S. Open Track and Field
 U.S. Open (USACO), United States of America Computing Olympiad-proctored programming competition
 U.S. Open (wrestling)